Sidney Welby Van Horn (September 8, 1920 - September 17, 2014)  was an American professional tennis player and tennis coach.

As a 19-year-old player, Van Horn reached the finals of the 1939 U.S. Champiomnships beating John Bromwich only to lose to Bobby Riggs in just 56 minutes (6–4, 6–2, 6–4).  One of the high points of his career was a 6–0, 6–2, 6–1 defeat of the great Bill Tilden at a match between U.S. and British Empire service teams at Wimbledon in July 1945, supposedly the worst losses of Tilden's career — Tilden, however, was 52 years old at the time while Van Horn was 25.  Van Horn also won the United States Pro Championship in 1945. He was ranked as high as World No. 5 in the professional ranks (the Professional Players Association, instated by Bill Tilden) in 1946. Gordon Lowe ranked Van Horn as World No. 9 for 1939 in his amateur rankings.

He lived briefly in Atlanta, Ga., where he had been hired as Head Tennis Professional at the Piedmont Driving Club. In 1951, he moved to Puerto Rico as a coach at the Caribe Hilton Swim and Tennis Club, where he worked with many promising juniors, the most notable being Charlie Pasarell who was ranked No.1 in the U.S. in 1967 who he continued to coach on the main tour, another notable junior was Manuel Diaz, later to become a star on the University of Georgia tennis team and UGA coach.

His career as a coach spawned institutions such as the Welby Van Horn Tennis Academy in Boca Raton, Florida, and Welby Van Horn Tennis programs in a number of locations.

References

1920 births
American male tennis players
American people of Dutch descent
Sportspeople from Boca Raton, Florida
2014 deaths
Professional tennis players before the Open Era
Tennis people from California